The Hollywood Music in Media Award for Best Original Song – TV Show/Mini Series is one of the awards given annually to people working in the television industry by the Hollywood Music in Media Awards (HMMA). It is presented to the lyricists, musicians and performers who have crafter the best "original" song, specifically for a television series or miniseries. The award was first given in 2015, during the sixth annual awards.

Winners and nominees

2010s
Best Original Song – TV Show/Digital Series

Best Original Song – TV Show/Limited Series

Best Original Song – TV Show/Mini Series

Best Original Song – TV Show/Limited Series

2020s

References

Best Original Song - TV Show Mini Series
American television awards